Katgun is a village in the Khatav taluka of Satara district in Maharashtra State, India.

Notable personalities 

  Mahatma Jyotiba Phule, the Indian activist, thinker, social reformer, writer and theologist was belongs to Katgun.

Jyothirao Govindrao Phule was born in 1827 into a family that belonged to the agricultural (Mali) caste, traditionally occupied as gardeners and considered to be one of the Shudhra varna in the ritual ranking system of Hinduism.[1] The original surname of the family had been Gorhe and had its origins in the village of Katgun, in present day Satara District, Maharashtra.

Connectivity 
Katgun is close to many larger towns including Vaduj, Satara.

References 

Villages in Satara district